Staffan William-Olsson (born 13 December 1959) is a Swedish jazz guitarist in the band The Real Thing who has worked with Bob Berg, Lee Konitz, and Palle Mikkelborg.

Career 
He played piano, guitar and drums already at the age of 7, and studied classical piano with a jazz-oriented teacher. Eventually he was oriented towards the guitar, with the blues and rock music as main sources of influence (Jimi Hendrix, Deep Purple and Led Zeppelin as main models).

When he discovered jazz-rock, Weather Report, John McLaughlin and Allan Holdsworth among others became the new sources of inspiration. George Benson's record Bad Benson was a turning point, it opened up his ears for the clean, undistorted guitar sound, and guitarists like Pat Martino was a great influence.

William-Olsson was after classical piano studies at Göteborg Musikhögskola (he is autodidact guitarist), the replacement for Ulf Wakenius in the Swedish fusion band Hawk on Flight, and also collaborated with such as Bob Berg, Lee Konitz and Palle Mikkelborg.

He moved to Oslo in 1986 and worked as a freelance guitarist before becoming a part of the hard rock band Sons of Angels in 1989. The band signed a recording contract with Atlantic Records, and toured the east coast of US and Europe. The album sold 100,000 copies, and the band broke up.

The Real Thing was established in 1992. The solo albums Three Shades of Blue (1995) and  Smile! (1998), was bouth nominated for the Spellemannprisen. Thereafter he has released two more albums, Oak Road Boogaloo (2000) and Pop! (2002). William-Olsson started the mini big band "Sharp 9" in 2005, inspired by the likes of Art Pepper and Miles Davis. Within "Sharp 9" he released NO:Network (2004) and Sudoku (2007).

Discography

Solo 
1995: Three Shades of Blue (Real Music Records)
1998: Smile! (Real Music Records)
2000: Oak Road Boogaloo (Real Music Records)
2002: Pop! (Real Music Records)

Collaborations 
Within The Real Thing
1992: The Real Thing (Real Music Records)
1993: ...in New York (Real Music Records), feat. Lew Soloff produced by Georg "Jojje" Wadenius, and nominated for the Spellemannprisen 1994
1994: A Perfect Match  (Real Music Records), with Bohuslän Big Band, arranged and produced by the Los Angeles-based arranger Tom Kubis
1995: Live (Real Music Records)
1997: Pleasure is an Attitude (Real Music Records)
2000: Deluxe (Real Music Records), with Even Kruse Skatrud and the Norwegian Radio Orchestra
2003: New Wrapping (Real Music Records)
2006: A Real Christmas (Real Music Records), feat. Sigrid Brennhaug on vocal

With Terje Gewelt
2013: Steppingstone (Resonant Music), including with Adam Nussbaum

With Sharp 9
2004: NO:Network (Real Music Records)
2007: Sudoku (Real Music Records)

References

External links 
Staffan William Olsson quartet – Body and soul on YouTube

Swedish jazz guitarists
Male jazz musicians
Swedish jazz composers
Male jazz composers
People from Gothenburg
1959 births
Living people
Mezzoforte (band) members
The Real Thing (Norwegian band) members